The Transformers: Stormbringer is a comic book mini-series, published by IDW Publishing.

The series debuted in July, 2006 and is set during the same time frame as The Transformers: Infiltration (the first issue shows Optimus Prime receiving Ironhide's call from Infiltration). It technically consists of issues seven through ten of the ongoing Transformers saga, which is split into arcs instead of being one complete series.  The four-issue series was written by Simon Furman with art by Don Figueroa. Unlike Infiltration, the series is set almost entirely on Cybertron. The series is available in The Transformers: Volume 2.

Plot summary

Relationship to other Transformers series
Dreamwave
 Writer Simon Furman and artist Don Figueroa had previously collaborated on several Transformers projects for Dreamwave Productions, the now-bankrupt company that has been granted the Transformers license from Hasbro.  They also reunited for IDW's two Beast Wars miniseries.
 Optimus Prime is seen in a pre-Earth form, which appears similar to his pre-Earth form in Dreamwave's The War Within series. Furman has said such a similarity is only coincidental. Stormbringer artist Don Figueroa was also the penciller on The War Within volume 1.

Marvel
 The Centurion drones of the story are a homage to the mechanoid of the same name that appeared in several of Simon Furman's Marvel UK Transformers strips.

IDW
A sequel of sorts would occur in the Spotlight issue on Galvatron, which revealed what happened to Thunderwing's body after it shut down. The issue on Arcee would reveal Bludgeon's fate as well, revealing his Spark was incarcerated on Garrus-9.
 The conversation between Razorclaw and Megatron in Stormbringer #3 also takes place at the end of Infiltration #4, although the reader does not hear the full conversation until Stormbringer.
 It's unknown whether the Decepticons on Nebulos are binary-bonded yet. However, since they are acting in "Siege Mode" (i.e. covertly) it is unlikely. The Headmaster process was created on Earth in The Transformers: Devastation by Scorponok, so it is highly unlikely that any Transformers other than Scorponok and Sunstreaker are true Headmasters yet.

Promotion
 The miniseries was promoted with the tagline "Nothing but robots on Cybertron!", referring to many fans' discontent over the human cast of Infiltration. The tagline wasn't entirely true — events also occurred on the planet Nebulos, a world populated by aliens of semi-humanoid appearance who feature in the Headmasters, Targetmasters and Powermasters Transformers toy line. Their appearance was minimal, though.

Artwork
 Jetfire's design for Stormbringer was based upon his toy in the Transformers Classics toy line in 2006.
 Thunderwing in phase 2 battle form can be seen here  fighting both Autobots and Decepticons.
 All the Decepticon cultists seen here are Pretenders in the toy line. While they have not received their shells, the Decepticons are drawn so that their robot forms somewhat resemble their Pretender shells. Bludgeon's shell is seen, however — it bears a strong resemblance to his classic look, but has visible tank treads and turrets, suggesting it can transform into a tank.
 In Prime's flashback to Megatron rousing him in issue #1, it appears that the Matrix is semi-visible under Prime's cracked chest plate.

Trade paperback
The trade paperback (TPB), originally slated for release in November 2006, was eventually released in February 2007, while a pocket sized "Manga" volume was released in April 2007. The TPB includes all the wraparound covers used throughout the series and some additional art by artist Don Figueroa.  Included are robot and alternate modes for Optimus Prime, Megatron and Bludgeon, all of which were only seen in robot mode in the series.  Concept art (in both modes) was included for Iguanus and Bomb-Burst.  In addition, art was included for several characters not featured in the series such as Cosmos (robot mode), one of the Seekers (with 2 different robot and alternate modes) and Astrotrain (3 modes).

References

2006 comics debuts
2006 comics endings
Stormbringer
IDW Publishing titles
Comic book limited series